Kayserling is a German surname, which means "emperor's follower" or "little emperor", from the terms kaysar (meaning kaiser or emperor) and the diminutive suffix -ling, meaning a smaller version of or a follower. Related names include Kaysersberg and Keyserling. The surname may refer to:

Meyer Kayserling (1829–1905), German historian
Simon Kayserling (1834–1898), German educator

See also 
 Keyserling

German-language surnames
Jewish surnames
Yiddish-language surnames